Marno is a given name. Notable people with the given name include:

Marno Frederickson (1906–1992), Canadian curler
Marno van Greuning (born 1997), South African cricketer
Marno Redelinghuys (born 1993), South African rugby union player 
Marno Verbeek (born 1965), Dutch econometrician